Sankt Andreasberg is a former town in the district of Goslar, in Lower Saxony, Germany. Since 1 November 2011, it is part of the town Braunlage. It is situated in the Harz, approximately 7 km west of Braunlage proper, and 20 km east of Osterode am Harz.

History 
Sankt Andreasberg was founded in the 1480s. It was first mentioned in a letter from the Count Heinrich zu Stolberg to Dietrich von Witzlebenon on 3 November 1487. The establishment of the village took place around the market. The first silver mines are assumed to be the St. Andrews Cross Mine at the foot of the Beerberg and the St. Andrews Mine (Grube St. Andreas) by the market. In 1521, St. Andreasberg received the right to mine from Counts Heinrich and Ernst von Hohenstein. It was proclaimed in Mansfelder Land and in the mining areas of Saxony and miners were invited to dig for silver and other metals.

Natural monuments 

The area around Sankt Andreasberg is especially rich in habitats worthy of protection in within the Harz National Park, but also around the town in the form of Upper Harz mountain meadows. In the national park north-northwest of Sankt Andreasberg are the Dreibrodesteine (at ca. ; ; ND GS 43), three outsize blocks of granite that have been formed by spheroidal weathering. According to legend they originated as the three loaves of bread of a heartless woman who would not help a starving miner. With the words  ("I'd rather my three loaves became stones") she spurned the miner, whereupon the loaves grew into giant stones and squashed the woman into the mossy earth. The granite blocks were considered a warning against heartlessness. At the Dreibrodesteine is checkpoint no. 154 (Dreibrodestein) in the Harzer Wandernadel hiking system and a memorial to the foresters and officials of the Andreasberg Forestry Office who fell in the two world wars.

Other natural monuments are a group of chestnuts on the market square (ND GS 42) and the  diabase deposit in the village of Silberhütte (ND GS 45). Johann Wolfgang von Goethe researched in 1783 the Hohe Klippen rocks (ND GS 146) on the Rehberg mountain above the present-day Goethe Place on the Rehberger Graben ditche, because he believed he would find evidence there for his assumptions about the earth's history. The boundary between the geological platform made of greywacke hornfels and the underlying fine-grained Brocken granite runs by the Hohe Klippen.

Religion 

The population of Sankt Andreasberg is mostly Protestant.

Sport 
As a result of their elevation, Sankt Andreasberg (520–720 m) and Sonnenberg (800–850 m) still have fairly guaranteed snow. Sankt Andreasberg is an Alpine Ski Centre of the Harz, with three T-bar lifts on the Sonnenberg as well as two double chair lifts and three T-bars at the Matthias Schmidt Mountain Centre. In the Teichtal there is the first snowtubing track in the Harz. The cross-country skiing trail network around Sankt Andreasberg has 40 km of tracks and is linked from the Sonnenberg to Oderbrück/Torfhaus and to the Ackerloipe/Altenau networks. On Matthias Schmidt Mountain a Sommerrodelbahn is open during the summer. Nordic Walking, hiking, mountain biking and trekking are popular summer activities in the peaceful surroundings of the Sankt Andreasberg mountain town. In the spa park there is a ropes course and climbing park. The southern part of the Oderteich reservoir in the Harz National Park is open to swimmers in the summer.

Coming from Torfhaus and Oderteich, the Brocken bypass section of the nearly 100 km long Harzer Hexenstieg hiking trail passes through the town and heads for Braunlage and Thale.

Mountain rescue services are provided by the local Harz Mountain Rescue Club.

Several Sankt Andreasberg sports clubs enjoy a long tradition. These include the Sankt Andreasberg Shooting Club (1522) and the Sankt Andreasberg Gymnastics and Sports Club (1861). Following the success of the 1st Winterfest in 1896 the Upper Harz Ski Club was founded on the Brocken; it is now called the St. Andreasberg Ski Club 1896.

Famous people 
 Wilhelm Trute (1836–1889), breeder of the Harz Roller canary breed and a local Miner

References

External links

 
Towns in Lower Saxony
Goslar (district)
Towns in the Harz
Natural monuments in Lower Saxony
Mining communities in Germany